Jehangir Vakil is an Indian television actor known for his role as Pratap in the serial, Balika Vadhu.

Career
Jehangir Vakil started his career with the TV series, Balika Vadhu (2008–2009).

References

Living people
Indian male television actors
Male actors from Mumbai
Year of birth missing (living people)